Wilcox Head is a cape in Avannaata municipality in northwestern Greenland.

Geography 

The cape is the western promontory on Kiatassuaq Island, delimiting the southern end of Melville Bay, with the other end defined as Cape York,  to the northwest, in northern Baffin Bay. An alternative endpoint for the bay is Nuussuup Nuua, the western promontory on Nuussuaq Peninsula.

References 

Headlands of Greenland
Inussulik Bay
Melville Bay
Upernavik Archipelago